Jorge Washington Peña Hen (January 16, 1928 – October 16, 1973) was a Chilean composer and an academic at the University of Chile.    He was murdered by the Caravan of Death.

Works
His children's opera La Cenicienta was composed in 1966. It was restaged in 2004 by Fondazione Teatro La Fenice, and in 2005 by University of Chile's Theatre in Santiago Chile.

Early life 
He was the son of Mrs. Vitalia Hen Muñoz and Dr. Tomás Peña Fernandez, medical Mayor, alderman, social actors and political leader, founder of the Socialist Party in the region of Coquimbo, and mediator of peace in the only air and sea battle took place in the port (1931).
Jorge was the eldest of three brothers. From an early age he demonstrated his leadership and talent as a composer and creator, writing his first piece at age fourteen. At 19 years old, into his beloved institution, the University of Chile, his qualities were felt immediately as an organizer, founding, along with Gustavo Becerra Alfonso Castagnetto and Sergio Canut de Bon, the magazine "Psalterium", to collect both the concerns of students of the National Conservatory, including concerns about the Chilean art world in general.

After graduating from piano and viola he entered the National Conservatory to study Composition and Conducting with the most renowned Chilean teachers.
Performing parallel as President of Student Center and introducing important reforms for the benefit of music and art.

Musician
In 1950 he moved to La Serena  with his wife, pianist Nella Camarda and made the Bach Society, in a city where there was no cultural activity.
He created a Philharmonic Orchestra, Polyphonic Choir and Chamber Groups that transformed the northern city in an important musical and cultural center. He created the Regional Conservatory of Music, which became the first Distribution of the University of Chile in the province. He produced cultural diffusion in La Serena and northern Chile through concerts in theaters, schools and outdoor festivals of choirs, musical and historical tours, Christmas Retablos, multitudinous shows which involved the whole city. He developed the Body of Dance and Performing Arts department at the Conservatorio Regional eaves. Complex choral symphony premiered works to date not been implemented in Chile, operas, music festivals and gatherings Symphonic American teachers.

Versatile
Composer, conductor, founder of institutions, his most emblematic of the high social content involved was the creation in 1964 of the first Children's Symphony Orchestra of Chile and Latin America, made up mostly of poor children who sought in the poorest schools in La Serena. Created a Charter School of Music, (the Escuela Experimental de Música "Jorge Peña Hen") with violin workshop, where children did their traditional curriculum and had strong emphasis on education and instrumental music, dance and body drama. As part of orchestras and bands, which made successful tours throughout Chile and neighboring countries. In 1961, he hosted the Chamber Orchestra of Antofagasta, which later would become the Philharmonic Orchestra.

Travel
Their quality as Conductor earned him invitations to conduct in Chile and Argentina.
His work as a composer starts very young. At age 21 he won the "Caupolicán" by the music of the Chilean film "River Below". He composed Concerto for Piano and Orchestra, Quartet (winner), Suite for Strings, many adaptations and arrangements of great composers, for children, symphonic, choral, incidental, for piano, for Retablos Christmas, Children's Opera Cinderella, selected worldwide and staged by Fondazione Teatro La Fenice in Venice (2005), Mounted in the Teatro de la Universidad de Chile, as Fondart Project (September 2005), with the OSEM and choirboys from schools in the capital, taking the design and regie his daughter Maria Fedora.
The versatility of Jorge Peña Hen as a composer is felt immediately, but the teacher did not dedicate all his time to composition, chose to put their skills to serve the society, having as main objective the mass of art, music. That all children have the opportunity to meet and enjoy the music and through it access to a world of equality in opportunities.

Works composed
Chanson D'Automne composed for chorus and orchestra, Concerto for piano and orchestra in C minor (both pieces at the age of 16 years), composed well, Andante and Allegro for Violin and Orchestra of children, Concertino for piano and orchestra of children, children's opera "Cinderella", String Quartet, Quintet for strings, two pieces for wind quintet, Sonata for violin and piano, Tonada for orchestra, ballet music for the coronation song cycle for baritone and orchestra, Twilight Montepatria, incidental music for films: Rio Abajo, and The Fertile Earth Nitrate, music for eight Retablos Christmas.

He made countless orchestrations and adaptations of works for their child musicians to be one of the most famous and emblematic "The Toys'Shop" By Prospero Bisquertt.

References

1928 births
1973 deaths
Chilean composers
Chilean male composers
20th-century classical composers
Chilean opera composers
Male classical composers
Male opera composers
Chilean people of Chinese descent
20th-century male musicians